Senator Redfield may refer to:

Heman J. Redfield (1788–1877), New York State Senate
James Redfield (Iowa soldier) (1824–1864), Iowa State Senate
Pam Redfield (born 1948), Nebraska State Senate
Timothy P. Redfield (1812–1888), Vermont State Senate